The Parco Regionale Spina Verde (en: “Green Spine Park”) is a regional natural park in Lombardy, northern Italy. It covers a hill ridge overlooking the town of Como, and borders on its northern side with   Switzerland. It finds itself in the town territory of Como (east) and the nearby municipalities of Colverde (west) and San Fermo della Battaglia (south). It was established in 1993 by a Regional Act (L. R. n. 10/1993) and is administered by the Region of Lombardy. It takes its name from the elevated ridge upon which it stretches, called “Spina Verde” (“green thorn”). The Park Administration is in Villa Imbonati, in San Fermo della Battaglia, co. Como.

Territory 
Its territory (almost entirely hills and woodlands, with many streams and springs) although surrounded by densely populated areas, shows well preserved and peaceful woodlands, and constitutes a vast greenland which offers many aspects of interest: its environmental characteristics are quite peculiar, displaying interesting geological and botanical features. 
Historical traces are remarkable: notably, middle-age fortifications and World-War 1 military works (Cadorna Line), as well as archeological sites of great importance dating from pre-historical times. The Park covers some of the oldest suburbs of Como, and religious buildings are a major feature, some dating to the very first times of Christianity, of great artistic and architectural worth.
The park offers also extraordinary views and landscapes, being located entirely on a highland ridge rising steeply from the Lombard plain and looking north the view dominates the lake of Como; on the south, the park overlooks the lombard plain allowing an exceptional view in every direction.
The Parco Spina Verde is easily accessible by several ways of communications: it is reached by rail or motorway, and a thick net of footpaths covers its entire territory joining the points of interest. Several restaurants, farms and inns provide quality accommodation and food around the year.

Natural and environmental sites 
Paré swamp and wetland: located in the village of Colverde, is a small but interesting area featuring several natural springs, where live protected natural species (notably the Lataste Frog and the Salamander).

Springs of river Seveso: sited on a hillside a few meters away the state border with Switzerland, it is a small stone building protecting the source of river Seveso. It is of remarkable natural importance due to a colony of river shrimps, elsewhere nearly extinct.

Camerlata stone quarry: the stone used to build, among other, the Baradello Castle and the cathedrals of Como, has been extracted in this quarry for centuries. Now derelict, the quarry hosts a fascinating site with deep caves and vertical ravines. It can be visited on demand.

The Border Road: a wide track crossing the woods, on the top of a high, forest-covered ridge, this rustic road runs along the state frontier with Switzerland and the border fence marks its northern limit for the most part. A popular path among hikers and trekkers, it joins several points of interest: the Paré Swamp, the Cadorna Line and, in Swiss territory just across the national border fence, a monument marks the southernmost point of the Swiss Confederacy, often visited by swiss tourists. Another interesting fact is that the Border Road was once much in use by smugglers: makeshift stores and hideouts can still be seen.

Archeological sites     
Mojenca spring: named after a celtic word meaning “wet, soaked”, it is one of the most striking places of the park. It consists of a natural spring in a deep rocky groove, which was covered and flanked by walls and a stone roof, in three separate phases the oldest of which dates to 3000 years ago and was used for religious cults, probably druidic, for many centuries. An amazing feature of the spring is that on Winter Solstice (December 21), the rays of the setting sun enter the spring illuminating it: a clear trace of its ancient religious role. It is one of the very few sites of its times still visible and preserved.

Pianvalle village: joined to Mojenca spring by a country track, it is a remarkable site showing remains of an ancient dwelling with working areas, dating back to 5th-6th century BC. Rock carvings and buildings foundations lead to identify it as a permanent, important settlement.

Roccia di Prestino: the “Prestino Rock” is a rocky wall nearby an ancient cart-track winding up the hillside, and used since very ancient times. It shows traces of symbolic carvings, dated to the Copper Age, leading to point out this site as a ritual place.

Stone Rooms: there are three known stone rooms carved in the rocky hillside during the Bronze Age, whose purpose is still uncertain: dwellings, stables, store, or other. Certainly, they required a great amount of labor and are all south-west oriented, indicating a common schema. The largest is called Camera Grande (en.: “great room”) and shows interesting carvings on its walls, and well-made drainage channels. A narrow path in the woods leads to another stone room (Camera Carugo) and shortly after to a third and smaller one (Camera Ovale). They are considered very important artifacts, as rare examples of the first human-made permanent dwellings in this area.

Historical sites 
Baradello Castle: built upon pre-existing Roman and Lombard fortifications, the castle is iconic of Como, with its main tower visible from afar. Once keystone of a huge defensive complex which included walls and ramparts running down and up the narrow passage through the steep hills, the Baradello castle (according to some sources, owning its name to a celtic word meaning “steep hillside/cliff”) was built in 12th century by the Holy Roman Emperor Frederick I “Redbeard” as a defence stronghold against the Milanese troops, during the century-long conflict between Como (faithful to the emperor) and Milan (rebel to the emperor). Long a symbol of the power of middle-age Como, the castle and the walls were dismantled by the Spanish troops in late 16th century. Only the tower survives, and is open to visits on demand. 

Cadorna Line: during 1917-18, the Italian army chief-of-staff, general Luigi Cadorna, ordered the construction of a 50ml defensive line along most of the border with Switzerland, to forestall a possible German attempt to invade Switzerland and attack Italy through the Alps. This conspicuous military complex included what is nowadays the territory of the Park, and many interesting works can still be seen, notably on the Sasso di Cavallasca Hill: blockhouses, caves, trenches, underground galleries and passages, most in good conditions and open to visits.

Cascina Respaù di Sopra: this ancient fortified farm, just nearby Baradello Castle, was built to provide the castle with food supplies (vegetables and cattle) for ordinary and emergency needs and was the center of a large agricultural complex including terraces and flat high grounds, once intensely cultivated, still visible. Today the farm is an inn and a restaurant.

Stairway to Heaven (“Scala del Paradiso”): built at the beginning of 20th century, it is an impressive work remnant of the “Smugglers Age”, when Como was the center of an illicit yet prosperous industry: smuggling across the Italian-swiss border. With more than 900 steps in solid stone, the Stairway led from the top of Cavallasca Hill descending the hill’s slope down to the town of Ponte Chiasso, flanking the state border fence that runs a few yards away. Meant to help the Italian Customs Guard in its duties, ironically it served smugglers just as well. Refurbished in 2005 the Stairway, locally nicknamed “Stairway to Heaven”, is now an attraction to trekkers and hikers and witnesses an era still alive in Como's memories.

Army Powder Store: in the valley of Valbasca, at the easternmost part of the park, it is still visible an abandoned ammunition depot of the Italian army, built in 1930s. It is a part of Como’s history as in 1941 it suffered the only air raid occurred in Como, when British airplanes bombed the depot with no results because all of the ammunition had been previously removed. The Powder Depot, for its history facts and its scenic location, is a favorite place for hikers.

Religious buildings 
Church of the Holy Lady in Drezzo (Chiesa di Madonna Assunta): this ancient church is sited in a scenic location, on the top of a hill overlooking the village of Drezzo (Colverde). It keeps interesting paintings dated to the 15th century, though the church is certainly older, as show its apse and isle of romanic style.

San Rocco Church-Painters’ Church (Chiesa di S. Rocco o dei Pittori): Built in 1857 on the remains of an older chapel, it is located on the hillside of the village of Cavallasca. It owes its name to the 14 artists who, in 1978, there painted the scenes of the Passion of Christ.

Basilica di San Carpoforo: probably the most ancient church of Como and among the oldest Christian religious buildings, it is mentioned as back as of 386 AD, when Saint Felix, first bishop of Como, ordered the construction of a church on the site of an ancient Roman temple where, in 311 AD, Saint Carpoforo and his companions had been executed because of their Christian faith. In this church, where Saint Carpoforo and later Saint Felix himself were buried, the very first Christian community of Como was established. A good example of romanic style, its architectural outlay is yet quite peculiar, with the front side facing  the mountain (the entrance is through a small door on the left wall). 

Basilica di San Abbondio: a masterful example of Lombard late-romanic style, at the southern end of the Park, the Basilica boasts two bell-towers: a common feature in german and french cathedrals but quite unusual in Italy. Built over an ancient proto-christian chapel, on the very side of the once strategic road called “Via Regina” (Royal Way) that linked Como with the swiss mountain passes and northern Europe, the Basilica was built in 1095 AD and refurbished and retouched several times after. The impressive entrance gates with their extensive carvings are considered a masterpiece of the famous “Magistri Comacini” (Como’s Craftsmen); the apse shows important paintings of the life of Christ, dated 13th century.

Oratorio dei Santi Cosma e Damiano (Shrine of Saint Cosma and Saint Damiano): a small church close to the nearby Basilica of Saint Abbondio, was built on the vault of a pagan temple and long used as a place of healing for the sick and the wounded. Today it is an exhibition space, and hosts several events around the year.

Viewpoints 
Due to its location, stretched along an elevated ridge rising steeply from the plain, the Parco Spina Verde has several viewpoints, built along the footpaths. These overlook the Lombard plain (south) which, on clear days, can range as far as the Ligurian Apennines; looking north, there are views of the Swiss Alps and of the town and lake of Como.

Tracks and footpaths 
Approximately 13 different paths, built partly on pre-existing country- and military roads, covering the entire territory of the park, allow to visit every corner. The paths have been designed to touch and link different subjects and environments: there are the Border Path, the Valbasca Path, the Fitness Path, the Castle Path, the Archeological Path to name but a few. A network of tracks and cart-roads still in use by farmers and woodsmen links all the paths.

Wildlife 
The Parco Spina Verde has a well-preserved environment where several species find refuge. 

Among birds, one can find the Owl, the Sparrowhawk, the Heron, the Red Kite and the Woodpecker. 
Among wild animals, the Boar has grown conspicuous in numbers in the last years;{{when>}} Roe Deers are a constant presence too, as well as the Fox, the Red Squirrel, the Badger.

The Volunteer Ecological Service and the National Guard of Lombardy ensure the vigilance over Park wildlife, structures and foothpaths and the enforcement of the park's rules.

Communications and ways of access 
The park is reached via Como itself, by motorway (A9 - exit Como Center) or railway (Trenord - station of Como-Camerlata, or FFS, station of Como - S. Giovanni).

References

External links 
 
 Parks of Italy

Lombardy
Como
Parks in Como